Balignane is a settlement in Senegal. It is located in Senegal's southernmost region, Casamance.

External links
PEPAM

Populated places in the Bignona Department
Arrondissement of Sindian